"Don't Look Behind You" is the twelfth episode of the third series of the 1960s cult British spy-fi television series The Avengers, starring Patrick Macnee and Honor Blackman. It was first broadcast by ABC on 14 December 1963. The episode was directed by Peter Hammond and written by Brian Clemens. It was remade with Emma Peel as episode 5-15, "The Joker".

Plot
Cathy is invited to the stately home of Sir Cavalier Rasagne, only to find that she has been lured into a trap by Martin Goodman, a deluded criminal who believes that she broke his heart.

Cast
 Patrick Macnee as John Steed
 Honor Blackman as Cathy Gale
 Maurice Good as Man, Martin Goodman 
 Kenneth Colley as Young Man 
 Janine Gray as Girl, Ola Monsey-Chamberlain

References

External links

Episode overview on The Avengers Forever! website

The Avengers (season 3) episodes
1963 British television episodes